Adath Israel Congregation is a Conservative egalitarian synagogue located at 37 Southbourne Avenue in the North York district of Toronto, Ontario. It is one of the largest Conservative Synagogues in Canada, with approximately 1,600 member families.

About Us
Adath Israel was founded in 1903 by Jewish immigrants from Romania as the First Roumanian Hebrew Congregation Adath Israel. Known as the "Roumainshe Shul", the synagogue started when new immigrants from Roumania gathered together in a rental space, eventually moving to its first permanent home on Centre Avenue.  In 1911, the synagogue dedicated a new building on Bathurst Street near Dundas, where for 30 years the congregation grew under the leadership of Rabbi Abraham Kelman.

In 1947, Rabbi Erwin Schild, newly ordained by the Yeshivah Torath Chaim of Toronto, became the new rabbi of the Congregation. The next few years at the synagogue were marked by tremendous growth in membership and activities to the point where, coupled with the shifting demographics of the Jewish community, a new building was constructed in its current location in North York. The formal name was shortened in the 1950s, and in 1957 the new building was officially dedicated.

In 1989, when Rabbi Schild chose to officially retire from the pulpit, he was succeeded by Rabbi Steven Saltzman z”l, a dynamic religious leader and noted scholar and author who officiated on the pulpit until his untimely passing in September 2014.

In 2003 Rabbi David C. Seed was hired as Rabbi and in 2015 Rabbi Moshe Meirovich assumed the role of an Interim Rabbi while the synagogue searched for a new senior rabbi.  And in the end, we didn't have to look far.  In March 2018, we welcomed Rabbi Adam Cutler as the new spiritual leader of Adath Israel.  Rabbi Cutler is the first Toronto born Rabbi to lead our congregation.

Many vital committees, such as Brotherhood, Sisterhood, Club L’ Chayim (55+), the Chesed Committee and Dynamic Singles, and numerous exciting social and educational programmes have been created over the years to meet the evolving needs of our membership, which currently boasts about 1,600 families. With the multitude of activities offered for children right through to seniors, there is truly something for everyone!

After 100 years of growth and achievements, Adath Israel Congregation looks confidently to the challenges of the future.

External links

Conservative synagogues in Canada
Romanian-Jewish culture in Canada
Synagogues in Toronto
Synagogues completed in 1957
Jewish organizations established in 1903
Religious buildings and structures in Toronto
North York
Romanian-Canadian history
20th-century religious buildings and structures in Canada